Four In Blue is a 1969 album by the Motown R&B group The Miracles, issued on the label's Tamla Records subsidiary (Tamla 297) in the U.S., and the Tamla-Motown label elsewhere in the world, (STML 11151). It was the final Miracles album of the 1960s. It reached #78 on the Billboard 200 pop album chart, and reached the Top 10 of Billboard's R&B Album chart, peaking at #3, despite the fact that no singles were released from this album in the U.S. or the UK.

The album takes its name from the blue silk tuxedos that The Miracles (Bobby Rogers, Pete Moore, Smokey Robinson and Ronnie White), wear on its cover. Although not on the cover, Miracles members Claudette Robinson and Marv Tarplin also contributed to this album.

The album is a combination of cover versions and original material, written by the Miracles' lead singer Smokey Robinson and Motown staff songwriters, such as Al Cleveland, Terry Johnson, Holland–Dozier–Holland, Deke Richards, Ashford & Simpson and Richard Morris. Cover songs in this collection included The Beatles' "Hey Jude", The Supremes' "My World Is Empty Without You", The Righteous Brothers' "You've Lost That Lovin' Feelin" and The 5th Dimension's "California Soul".

The album was released on CD in 2001 in a two-in-one set with the Miracles' album, Time Out for Smokey Robinson & The Miracles. The CD release contains an alternative mix of "Don't Say You Love Me" which contains finished background vocals.

Track listing 
Side one
 "You Send Me (With Your Good Lovin')" (Al Cleveland, Terry "Buzzy" Johnson, Smokey Robinson)
 "Dreams Dreams" (Robinson, Cleveland)
 "Tomorrow Is Another Day" (Deke Richards, Beatrice Verdi)
 "Hey Jude" (John Lennon, Paul McCartney)
 "California Soul" (Nickolas Ashford, Valerie Simpson)
 "A Legend in Its Own Time" (Robinson)

Side two
 "You've Lost That Lovin' Feelin'" (Barry Mann, Phil Spector, Cynthia Weil)
 "We Can Make It We Can" (Ashford, Simpson)
 "When Nobody Cares" (Robinson)
 "Don't Say You Love Me" (Richard Morris)
 "Wish I Knew" (Debbie Dean, Richards)
 "My World Is Empty Without You" (Brian Holland, Lamont Dozier, Eddie Holland)

Personnel

The Miracles

 Smokey Robinson – lead vocals
 Claudette Robinson – backing vocals
 Pete Moore – backing vocals
 Bobby Rogers – backing vocals
 Ronnie White – backing vocals
 Marv Tarplin – guitar

Other Credits

 The Funk Brothers – instrumentation

Charts

References

External links 
The Miracles Four In Blue – original cover artwork
[ Billboard.com]
All Music Guide review # 2

1969 albums
The Miracles albums
Tamla Records albums
Albums produced by Smokey Robinson
Albums recorded at Hitsville U.S.A.